"Live for Today" is a song by the American rock band Toto. It was released on their 1981 album Turn Back, and was released in Japan as the final single from that album.

This was the first song that Steve Lukather wrote for the band.

It reached number 40 on the Mainstream Rock Charts.

References

1981 songs
Toto (band) songs